Ganbatyn is a Mongolian patronymic. Notable people with this patronymic include:

Ganbatyn Boldbaatar (born 1987), Mongolian judoka
Ganbatyn Bolor-Erdene (born 1995), Mongolian parataekwondo practitioner
Ganbatyn Erdenebold (born 1993), Mongolian artistic gymnast
Ganbatyn Jargalanchuluun (born 1986), Mongolian short track speed skater

Mongolian-language patronymics